Al-Suwayda al-Gharbiya is a Syrian village located in the Subdistrict of the Hama District in the Hama Governorate. According to the Syria Central Bureau of Statistics (CBS), al-Suwayda al-Gharbiyah had a population of 522 in the 2004 census. Its inhabitants are predominantly Sunni Muslims.

References

Bibliography

Populated places in Hama District